Orthetrum azureum is a freshwater dragonfly species, occurring on Madagascar. It is widely spread throughout the whole country, and can be found in various habitats, such as gardens and degraded forests.

See also 
 Orthetrum

References 

Libellulidae
Insects described in 1842
Insects of Madagascar